The  following is a List of awards and nominations received by Australian film director, screenwriter, producer, and former medical doctor George Miller.

Major associations

Academy Awards

BAFTA Awards

Golden Globe Awards

Other awards and nominations

AACTA Awards

Alliance of Women Film Journalists

Annie Award

Austin Film Critics Association

Australian Film Institute Global Achievement Award

Boston Online Film Critics Association

Central Ohio Film Critics Association

Chicago Film Critics Association

Critics' Choice Movie Awards

Dallas–Fort Worth Film Critics Association

Denver Film Critics Society

Detroit Film Critics Society

Directors Guild of America Award

Empire Award

FIAPF Award

Florida Film Critics Circle

London Film Critics' Circle

National Board of Review

Producers Guild of America Awards

Saturn Award

Writers Guild of America Awards

References

External links
 

Lists of awards received by film director
Lists of awards received by writer